The 2018 TAC Cup Girls season was the second season of the TAC Cup Girls competition for under-18 female Australian rules footballers in Victoria. The season commenced on 3 March and concluded on 19 May. The premiership was won by the Geelong Falcons, who defeated the Northern Knights in the first Grand Final match in the competition.

Ladder

Grand Final

References

NAB League
NAB League Girls
Nab League Girls